Berrow Green is a village in Worcestershire, England.

Berrow Hill Camp
Berrow Green is situated just below Berrow Hill Camp, an Iron Age encampment or fort.

References

Sources
 
 

Villages in Worcestershire